Traminda is a genus of moths in the family Geometridae described by Saalmüller in 1891.

Species
Some species of this genus are:
Traminda acuta (Warren, 1897)
Traminda aequipuncta Herbulot, 1984
Traminda atroviridaria (Mabille, 1880)
Traminda aventiaria (Guenée, [1858])
Traminda drepanodes Prout, 1915
Traminda falcata Warren, 1897
Traminda mundissima (Walker, 1861)
Traminda neptunaria (Guenée, 1858)
Traminda obversata (Walker, 1861)
Traminda ocellata Warren, 1895
Traminda syngenes  Prout, 1916
Traminda vividaria (Walker, 1861)

References
Saalmüller, M. & von Heyden, L. 1891. Lepidopteren von Madagascar. Zweite Abtheilung. Heterocera: Noctuae, Geometrae, Microlepidoptera. :247–531, pls. 7–14.

Cosymbiini